A tension band wire is a form of orthopaedic internal fixation method used to convert distraction forces into compression forces, promoting bone healing.
 Olecranon fracture
 Patella fracture
 malleolar fracture

See also
 Orthopedic plates

References

Orthopedic surgical procedures
Orthopedic treatment

de:Zuggurtung